The Rosebud County Courthouse, located on Main St. between 12th and 13th Avenues in Forsyth in Rosebud County, Montana, was built in 1913.  It was listed on the National Register of Historic Places in 1986.

It is a two-story concrete and masonry building on an elevated sandstone foundation.  It was described in its NRHP nomination as a "good example of the distinctive Neo-Classical style as designed by the well known Montana architectural firm of Link and Haire."

References

National Register of Historic Places in Rosebud County, Montana
Neoclassical architecture in Montana
Government buildings completed in 1913
County courthouses in Montana
1913 establishments in Montana
Courthouses on the National Register of Historic Places in Montana